İsmail Hacıoğlu (born 30 November 1985) is a Turkish actor and son of Turkey national under-18 football team  coach Mehmet Hacıoğlu and brother of actress Kardelen Hacıoğlu. Since the beginning his career, he is cited as one of the best actors of his generation.

Career
His paternal family is of Turkish descent who immigrated from Bulgaria. He started acting by playing in a play when he was in the fifth grade of elementary school. He studied Theater at Müjdat Gezen Art Center. He has been involved in theater plays for two seasons there. He played in the private theater of Aydoğan Tamer and Erdal Duman, and then at the Istanbul Youth Theater. While he was studying at Müjdat Gezen Art Center, he started dubbing ads. While playing in "Bir Istanbul Masalı", he  won the theater Department of Mimar Sinan University State Conservatory but then dropped out of the university. He has appeared in many popular films and series. He has numerous awards and box office successes.

At the age of fifteen, he began  his tv career with sequel series Günaydın İstanbul Kardeş. He played in hit youth series "Koçum Benim". He was cast in popular dramas "Bir İstanbul Masalı", "Beyaz Gelincik". He played in Sinekli Bakkal which based of classic novel. With his ex-wife Vildan Atasever, he played in Gece Sesleri based of novel. 

He portrayed two roles as Mehmed II and Fatih İkinci in surreal period comedy "Osmanlı Tokadı" alongside Vildan Atasever, Pelin Akil. He played in period comedy "Zeyrek ile Çeyrek" which spin-off series of Filinta. He portrayed as Üsküplü Ali in historical drama "Mehmetçik Kut'ül Amare"..

He played two characters in "Mahkum" which won Seoul Best Series Award.

His web series are "Hükümsüz" and "Ölüm Kime Yakışır".

Filmography

Awards
2003 – 40th Antalya Film Festival – Hopeful Young Actor for The Encounter (Karşılaşma)
2003 – 15th Ankara Film Festival – Mehmet Emin Toprak - Hopeful New Actor for The Encounter
2003 – 25th Siyad Türk Cinema Awards – Hopeful Artist of the Year for The Encounter
2004 – 11th ÇASOD "Best Actor" Awards – Hopeful Actor for The Encounter
2009 – 20th Ankara Film Festival Awards – "Best Supporting Actor" - Üç Elma Düştü2011 – 16th Sadri Alışık Awards – "Best Actor of the Year" -Çakal'' – Erhan Kozan

References

External links
 

1985 births
Living people
Turkish male television actors
21st-century Turkish actors
Turkish male film actors
Male actors from Istanbul